Little Dragon Maiden, also known as The Brave Archer 5, is a 1983 Hong Kong film adapted from Louis Cha's novel The Return of the Condor Heroes. Little Dragon Maiden and The Brave Archer and His Mate (1982) are seen as unofficial sequels to the Brave Archer film trilogy (The Brave Archer, The Brave Archer 2 and The Brave Archer 3).

Cast (In Hokkien.)
 Leslie Cheung as Yo Ko / Yo Kang
 Mary Jean Reimer as Siauw-liong-lie
 Chen Kuan-tai as Kwee Ceng
 Leanne Liu as Oey Yong
  as Li Mochou
 Lung Tien-hsiang as Jinlun Fawang
 Ku Kuan-chung as Huodu
 Ku Feng as Ang Cit-kong
 Lo Lieh as Auw-yang Hong
 Sun Chien as Qiu Qianren
 Hung San-nam as Yin Zhiping
 Wong Lik as Zhao Zhijing
 Lai Yin-san as Cheng Ying
 Chan Lau as Oey Yok-su
 Eddy Ko Hung as Da'erba
 Steve Mak as Lu Qingdu
 Lam Chi-tai as Zhiguang
 Eric Chan as Wu Dunru
 Siao Yuk as Wu Xiuwen
 Yiu Man-kei as Ni Moxing
 Choi Kwok-keung as Yin Kexi
 Stephen Chan as Xiaoxiangzi
 Wang Han-chen
 Wan Seung-lam
 Lau Fong-sai
 Ngai Tim-choi
 Kong Long
 Lau Cheun
 Kam Tin-chiu
 Tang Yuk-wing
 Lam Tit-ching
 Cheung Wing-cheung
 Fung Ming

External links
 
 

1983 films
Films based on works by Jin Yong
Hong Kong martial arts films
Films based on The Return of the Condor Heroes
Wuxia films
1980s Hong Kong films